Ajhai Pani is a Nepali film released in February 2015. It is the final film of director Alok Nembang. The film features Sudarshan Thapa and Puza Sharma in lead roles.

Plot
The movie portrays a romance between Kushal (Sudarshan Thapa) and Yunisha (Puza Sharma). It also features Surakshya Pant as Shaili, and Bijay Lama as Yunisha's uncle.

Cast
Sudarshan Thapa as Kushal
Pooja Sharma as Yunisha
Surakshya Panta as Shaili
Mithila Sharma as Kushal's grandmother
Ramsharan Pathak as of Kushal's grandfather
Bijay Lama as Yunisha's uncle
Bishal Dhungana as Bhuwan
Pushpa Khadka as Biren

Soundtrack

References 

Nepalese romantic comedy films